Prey of Vultures, The Artist Is a Gunfighter or Revenge of the Resurrected is a 1972 Spanish Spaghetti Western film directed by Rafael Romero Marchent, written by Luis Gaspar, scored by Nora Orlandi and starring Peter Lee Lawrence, Alfredo Mayo, Carlos Romero Marchent and Frank Braña

Cast

References

External links
 

Spanish Western (genre) films
1972 Western (genre) films
1972 films
Spaghetti Western films
Films directed by Rafael Romero Marchent
Films produced by Luciano Martino
Films with screenplays by Ernesto Gastaldi
Films scored by Nora Orlandi
Films shot in Madrid
Films shot in Rome
1970s Italian films